North China Pharmaceutical Group Corp. (NCPC), is a pharmaceutical manufacturer in China. NCPC, in its early days, was one of the key construction projects during Chinese First Five-Year Plan. After five years of construction from the foundation date in June 1953, the successful operation started in June 1958. Being one of the antibiotic producers both in technology and production scale at that time, NCPC created a history of commercial production of antibiotics in China. With 45 years development, NCPC has been continually growing and taking the lead in China pharmaceutical industry in key economic indexes, ranking one of the Top500 Enterprises and the best profit-makers in China. By the end of 2002, the total assets is USD 2 billion, number of employees 18500. In 2002, NCPC achieved domestic sales revenue US$700 million and export sales US$100 million.

Organization
NCPC now has 29 subsidiaries. Among which North China Pharmaceutical Co., Ltd. is a listed company at Shanghai Stock Exchange with 59.87% of shares held by NCPC. NCPC is one of the four groups of the candidate enterprises approved by China Securities Regulatory Commission for overseas listing. Keeping in close cooperation with foreign companies and institutions, NCPC has established 16 joint ventures and cooperative ventures.

Products
NCPC currently produces over 430 kinds of antibiotics, semi-synthetic antibiotics, pharmaceutical intermediates, synthetic vitamins, biotechnology products, veterinary and neutraceuticals both in bulk and in finished products. NCPC sells bulk antibiotics , vitamins 10000 tons, antibiotic intermediates 7500 tons, powder for injection 1.8 billion vials, capsules 1.03 billion grains annually. The capacity of penicillin, streptomycin, 6-APA, amoxycillin, cefaradine, vitamin B100 are in the lead worldwide. NCPC's next development focus is on biotechnology products, bio-pesticides and animal products. Since 1984, NCPC has initiated research on modern biotechnology and formed the system for developing generic drug involving new products R&D, pilot production and commercial production. In cooperation with the foreign companies, NCPC has completed the design and construction of GeneTech Biotechnology Co., Ltd. who is now a modern biotechnology production base in line with international practice and standards. There are rhGM-CSF, rhG-CSF, EPO and Hepatitis B Vaccine (CHO) on market at present.

R&D
Through its independent research and development, NCPC was the first in China to succeed in developing dozen of new products: such as bacitracin, kasugamycin, bleomycin, amphotericin B, lindomycin, clindamycin, clindamycin phosphate and norvancomycin. NCPC New Drug R&D Co., Ltd. is responsible for the new drug and technology development of the whole NCPC Group. Nearly 300 experts and technicians, advanced instruments and integrated pilot unit make it possible to transform laboratory reactions into large-scale production. In recent 10 years, R&D investment of NCPC kept occupying over 30% of sales volume annually. NCPC has been transferring from generic imitation into original research in new drug development and forming a development platform of its own. Its original research focuses on the natural and small molecular drugs screening, combinatorial chemical technology and modern biotechnology.

See also
Pharmaceutical industry in China
Animal Science Products v. Hebei Welcome Pharmaceuticals

References

External links
North China Pharmaceutical Group Corp 

Pharmaceutical companies of China
Companies based in Hebei
Vaccine producers
Generic drug manufacturers
Biotechnology companies of China
Chinese brands
Pharmaceutical companies established in 1958
Chinese companies established in 1958